Starry Night is the second extended play by South Korean singer BoA. It was released by SM Entertainment and distributed by Dreamus on December 11, 2019. A track of the same name was released as the lead single featuring Crush.

Release 
The EP was released on December 11, 2019, through several music portals, including MelOn and Apple Music.

Commercial performance 
The album debuted and peaked at number 6 on the Gaon Album Chart for the week ending December 14, 2019. In its second week the album fell to number 46 and in its third week to number 88.

The album sold 8,817 copies in December 2019.

Track listing

Charts

References 
2019 EPs
SM Entertainment EPs